Secrets is an RTÉ television light entertainment show that was hosted by Gerry Ryan and broadcast on Saturday evenings for three series between 1990 and 1993. The studio-based show allowed viewers and audience members to realize their ambitions and dreams.

References

1990 Irish television series debuts
1993 Irish television series endings
1990s Irish television series
Irish variety television shows
RTÉ original programming